Adam Clarke was a theologian.

Adam Clarke may also refer to:

Adam Clarke (Durham University cricketer)
Adam Clarke (Cambridge University cricketer)

See also
Adam Clark (disambiguation)